Winterscleugh is a hill of  in Cumbria, England, to the east of the Lake District. It is in the far east of the Lake District National Park since the national park's expansion in 2019. It is east of the A6 road and west of the M6 motorway, on the northern side of Borrowdale, Westmorland (not the better known Borrowdale in the central Lake District).

Overview 
The name Winterscleugh is said to mean "the ravine associated with the family of Edward Winter, recorded from C17th as land-holders in Borrowdale".

It is one of three summits, along with Grayrigg Forest and Whinfell Beacon, added to the list of Fellrangers in the new edition (2019-2021) of Mark Richards' eight volumes of guidebooks and bringing the total to 230. They were added after the Lake District National Park boundary was extended in 2019, including them for the first time.

References

Fells of the Lake District
Tebay